Twin Sisters is a  mountain summit located in San Juan County, Colorado, United States. Twin Sisters is part of the San Juan Mountains range which is a subset of the Rocky Mountains, and is west of the Continental Divide. It is situated 7.5 miles southwest of the community of Silverton, on land managed by San Juan National Forest. It is set 5.5 miles north of Engineer Mountain, and 2.2 miles east of Rolling Mountain, the nearest higher neighbor. Other neighbors include Snowdon Peak seven miles to the southeast, and Golden Horn, 3.5 miles to the northwest. The mountain's name, which has been officially adopted by the United States Board on Geographic Names, was in use in 1906 when Henry Gannett published it in A Gazetteer of Colorado.

Climate 
According to the Köppen climate classification system, Twin Sisters is located in an alpine subarctic climate zone with long, cold, snowy winters, and cool to warm summers. Due to its altitude, it receives precipitation all year, as snow in winter, and as thunderstorms in summer, with a dry period in late spring. Precipitation runoff from the mountain drains into tributaries of the Animas River.

See also

References

External links 

 Weather forecast: Twin Sisters

Mountains of San Juan County, Colorado
San Juan Mountains (Colorado)
Mountains of Colorado
North American 4000 m summits
San Juan National Forest